Bothy Bay is a small bay on the northwest side of Fildes Peninsula, King George Island. The name, applied by the UK Antarctic Place-Names Committee in 1977, is suggested by a crude stone hut ("bothy"), evidently built by nineteenth-century sealers, on the shore of the bay.

References 

Bays of King George Island (South Shetland Islands)